Mauro Jacddul Donoso Godoy (born 23 December 1971 in Chile) is a Chilean retired footballer who now works as head coach of Auckland United FC Women in New Zealand.

Playing career

Donoso started his senior career with O'Higgins. In 1992, he signed for Unión Española in the Chilean Primera División, where he made forty-eight league appearances and scored zero goals. After that, he played for Chilean clubs C.D. Antofagasta, Deportes Concepción, and Audax Italiano, New Zealand club Football Kingz, and Chilean club C.D. Huachipato before retiring in 2005.

Coaching career
Donoso made his home in New Zealand and works as football manager for Auckland United women's team.

References

External links
 Mauro Donoso at playmakerstats.com (English version of ceroacero.es)
 Soccer: Chile import warms to Kingz 
 Football Kingz' legacy on display in the coaching ranks at the national cup finals
 SOCCER - Former football royal brings tips to Tikipunga 
 Soccer: Chance for Chilean as more defenders quit 
 Mauro Donoso, el último refuerzo acerero: «Prometo sacrificio y entrega» 
 Concepción: descartado Mauro Donoso 
 Permiso post natal
 Mauro Donoso y Julio César Laffatigue suenan como refuerzos en Unión Temuco

1971 births
Living people
Footballers from Santiago
Chilean footballers
Chilean expatriate footballers
O'Higgins F.C. footballers
Unión Española footballers
C.D. Antofagasta footballers
Deportes Concepción (Chile) footballers
Audax Italiano footballers
Football Kingz F.C. players
Waitakere City FC players
C.D. Huachipato footballers
Chilean Primera División players
Primera B de Chile players
National Soccer League (Australia) players
Chilean expatriate sportspeople in New Zealand
Expatriate association footballers in New Zealand
Chilean expatriate sportspeople in Australia
Expatriate soccer players in Australia
Association football defenders
Chilean football managers
Expatriate association football managers in New Zealand